Military strategy is a set of ideas implemented by military organizations to pursue desired strategic goals. Derived from the Greek word strategos, the term strategy, when first used during the 18th century, was seen in its narrow sense as the "art of the general", or "'the art of arrangement" of troops. and deals with the planning and conduct of campaigns, the movement and disposition of forces, and the deception of the enemy.

The father of Western modern strategic studies, Carl von Clausewitz (1780–1831), defined military strategy as "the employment of battles to gain the end of war." B. H. Liddell Hart's definition put less emphasis on battles, defining strategy as "the art of distributing and applying military means to fulfill the ends of policy". Hence, both gave the pre-eminence to political aims over military goals.

Sun Tzu (544–496 BC) is often considered as the father of Eastern military strategy and greatly influenced Chinese, Japanese, Korean and Vietnamese historical and modern war tactics. The Art of War by Sun Tzu grew in popularity and saw practical use in Western society as well. It continues to influence many competitive endeavors in Asia, Europe, and America including culture, politics, and business, as well as modern warfare. The Eastern military strategy differs from the Western by focusing more on asymmetric warfare and deception. Chanakya's Arthashastra has been an important strategic and political compendium in Indian and Asian history as well.

Strategy differs from operations and tactics, in that strategy refers to the employment of a nation's entire military capabilities through high-level and long-term planning, development, and procurement to guarantee security or victory. Operations and Tactics is the art of organizing forces on or near the battlefield to secure objectives as part of the broader military strategy.

Fundamentals

Military strategy is the planning and execution of the contest between groups of armed adversaries. It is a subdiscipline of warfare and of foreign policy, and a principal tool to secure national interests. Its perspective is larger than military tactics, which involve the disposition and manoeuvre of units on a particular sea or battlefield, but less broad than grand strategy otherwise called national strategy, which is the overarching strategy of the largest of organizations such as the nation state, confederation, or international alliance and involves using diplomatic, informational, military and economic resources. Military strategy involves using military resources such as people, equipment, and information against the opponent's resources to gain supremacy or reduce the opponent's will to fight, developed through the precepts of military science.

NATO's definition of strategy is "presenting the manner in which military power should be developed and applied to achieve national objectives or those of a group of nations. Strategy may be divided into 'grand strategy', geopolitical in scope and 'military strategy' that converts the geopolitical policy objectives into militarily achievable goals and campaigns. Field Marshal Viscount Alanbrooke, Chief of the Imperial General Staff and co-chairman of the Anglo-US Combined Chiefs of Staff Committee for most of the Second World War, described the art of military strategy as: "to derive from the [policy] aim a series of military objectives to be achieved: to assess these objectives as to the military requirements they create, and the pre-conditions which the achievement of each is likely to necessitate: to measure available and potential resources against the requirements and to chart from this process a coherent pattern of priorities and a rational course of action." Field-Marshal Montgomery summed it up thus "Strategy is the art of distributing and applying military means, such as armed forces and supplies, to fulfil the ends of policy. Tactics means the dispositions for, and control of, military forces and techniques in actual fighting. Put more shortly: strategy is the art of the conduct of war, tactics the art of fighting."

Background
Military strategy in the 19th century was still viewed as one of a trivium of "arts" or "sciences" that govern the conduct of warfare; the others being tactics, the execution of plans and maneuvering of forces in battle, and logistics, the maintenance of an army. The view had prevailed since the Roman times, and the borderline between strategy and tactics at this time was blurred, and sometimes categorization of a decision is a matter of almost personal opinion. Carnot, during the French Revolutionary Wars thought it simply involved concentration of troops.

Strategy and tactics are closely related and exist on the same continuum; modern thinking places the operational level between them. All deal with distance, time and force but strategy is large scale, can endure through years, and is societal while tactics are small scale and involve the disposition of fewer elements enduring hours to weeks. Originally strategy was understood to govern the prelude to a battle while tactics controlled its execution. However, in the world wars of the 20th century, the distinction between maneuver and battle, strategy and tactics, expanded with the capacity of technology and transit. Tactics that were once the province of a company of cavalry would be applied to a panzer army.

It is often said that the art of strategies defines the goals to achieve in a military campaign, while tactics defines the methods to achieve these goals. Strategic goals could be "We want to conquer area X", or "We want to stop country Y's expansion in world trade in commodity Z"; while tactical decisions range from a general statement—e.g., "We're going to do this by a naval invasion of the North of country X", "We're going to blockade the ports of country Y", to a more specific "C Platoon will attack while D platoon provides fire cover".

In its purest form, strategy dealt solely with military issues. In earlier societies, a king or political leader was often the same person as the military leader. If not, the distance of communication between the political and the military leader was small. But as the need of a professional army grew, the bounds between the politicians and the military came to be recognized. In many cases, it was decided that there was a need for a separation.

As French statesman Georges Clemenceau said, "War is too important a business to be left to soldiers." This gave rise to the concept of the grand strategy which encompasses the management of the resources of an entire nation in the conduct of warfare. In the environment of the grand strategy, the military component is largely reduced to operational strategy—the planning and control of large military units such as corps and divisions. As the size and number of the armies grew and the technology to communicate and control improved, the difference between "military strategy" and "grand strategy" shrank. Fundamental to grand strategy is the diplomacy through which a nation might forge alliances or pressure another nation into compliance, thereby achieving victory without resorting to combat. Another element of grand strategy is the management of the post-war peace.

As Clausewitz stated, a successful military strategy may be a means to an end, but it is not an end in itself. There are numerous examples in history where victory on the battlefield has not translated into goals such as long term peace, security or tranquillity.

Principles

Many military strategists have attempted to encapsulate a successful strategy in a set of principles. Sun Tzu defined 13 principles in his The Art of War while Napoleon listed 115 maxims. American Civil War General Nathan Bedford Forrest had only one: to "[get] there first with the most men". The concepts given as essential in the United States Army Field Manual of Military Operations (FM 3–0) are:

 Objective Type (Direct every military operation towards a clearly defined, decisive, and attainable objective)
 Offensive Type (Seize, retain, and exploit the initiative)
 Mass Type (Concentrate combat power at the decisive place and time)
 Economy of Force Type (Allocate minimum essential combat power to secondary efforts)
 Maneuver Type (Place the enemy in a disadvantageous position through the flexible application of combat power)
 Unity of Command Type (For every objective, ensure unity of effort under one responsible commander)
 Security Type (Never permit the enemy to acquire an unexpected advantage)
 Surprise Type (Strike the enemy at a time, at a place, or in a manner for which they are unprepared)
 Simplicity Type (Prepare clear, uncomplicated plans and clear, concise orders to ensure thorough understanding)

According to Greene and Armstrong, some planners assert adhering to the fundamental principles guarantees victory, while others claim war is unpredictable and the strategist must be flexible. Others argue predictability could be increased if the protagonists were to view the situation from the other sides in a conflict. Field Marshal Count Helmuth von Moltke expressed strategy as a system of "ad hoc expedients" by which a general must take action while under pressure. These underlying principles of strategy have survived relatively unscathed as the technology of warfare has developed.

Strategy (and tactics) must constantly evolve in response to technological advances. A successful strategy from one era tends to remain in favor long after new developments in military weaponry and matériel have rendered it obsolete. World War I, and to a great extent the American Civil War, saw Napoleonic tactics of "offense at all costs" pitted against the defensive power of the trench, machine gun and barbed wire. As a reaction to her World War I experience, France attempted to use its Maginot Line to apply the principles Mass and Economy of force, in that troops could be concentrated in the north for an offensive there while the Line acted as force multiplier in the south, and Maneuver and Security, by preventing the Germans from going directly from Alsace to Paris.

Development

Antiquity
The principles of military strategy emerged at least as far back as 500 BC in the works of Sun Tzu and Chanakya. The campaigns of Alexander the Great, Chandragupta Maurya, Hannibal, Qin Shi Huang, Julius Caesar, Zhuge Liang, Khalid ibn al-Walid and, in particular, Cyrus the Great demonstrate strategic planning and movement. Mahan describes in the preface to The Influence of Sea Power upon History how the Romans used their sea power to effectively block the sea lines of communication of Hannibal with Carthage; and so via a maritime strategy achieved Hannibal's removal from Italy, despite never beating him there with their legions.

One of these strategies was shown in the battle between Greek city states and Persia. The Battle of Thermopylae in which the Greek forces were outnumbered stood as a good military strategy. The Greek allied forces ultimately lost the battle, but the training, use of armor, and location allowed them to defeat many Persian troops before losing. In the end, the Greek alliance lost the battle but not the war as a result of that strategy which continued on to the battle of Plataea. The Battle of Plataea in 479 BC resulted in a victory for the Greeks against Persia, which exemplified that military strategy was extremely beneficial to defeating a numerous enemy.

Early strategies included the strategy of annihilation, exhaustion, attrition warfare, scorched earth action, blockade, guerrilla campaign, deception and feint. Ingenuity and adeptness were limited only by imagination, accord, and technology. Strategists continually exploited ever-advancing technology. The word "strategy" itself derives from the Greek "στρατηγία" (strategia), "office of general, command, generalship", in turn from "στρατηγός" (strategos), "leader or commander of an army, general", a compound of "στρατός" (stratos), "army, host" + "ἀγός" (agos), "leader, chief", in turn from "ἄγω" (ago), "to lead".  No evidence exists of it being used in a modern sense in Ancient Greek, but we find it in Byzantine documents from the 6th century onwards, and most notably in the work attributed to Emperor Leo VI the Wise of Byzantium.

Middle Ages

Genghis Khan and the Mongols

As a counterpoint to European developments in the strategic art, the Mongol Emperor Genghis Khan provides a useful example. Genghis' successes, and those of his successors, were based on manoeuvre and terror. The main focus of Genghis' strategic assault was the psychology of the opposing population. By steady and meticulous implementation of this strategy, Genghis and his descendants were able to conquer most of Eurasia. The building blocks of Genghis' army and his strategy were his tribal levies of mounted archers, scorched earth-style methods, and, equally essential, the vast horse-herds of Mongolia.

Each archer had at least one extra horse—there was an average five horses per man—thus the entire army could move with astounding rapidity. Moreover, since horse milk and horse blood were the staples of the Mongolian diet, Genghis' horse-herds functioned not just as his means of movement but as his logistical sustainment. All other necessities would be foraged and plundered. Khan's marauders also brought with them mobile shelters, concubines, butchers, and cooks. Through maneuver and continuous assault, Chinese, Persian, Arab and Eastern European armies could be stressed until they collapsed, and were then annihilated in pursuit and encirclement.

Compared to the armies of Genghis, nearly all other armies were cumbersome and relatively static. It was not until well into the 20th century that any army was able to match the speed of deployment of Genghis' armies. When confronted with a fortified city, the Mongol imperatives of maneuver and speed required that it be quickly subdued. Here the terror engendered by the bloody reputation of the Mongolians helped to intimidate and subdue.

So too did primitive biological warfare. A trebuchet or other type of ballista weapon would be used to launch dead animals and corpses into a besieged city, spreading disease and death, such as the Black Plague. If a particular town or city displeased the Mongolian Khan, everyone in the city would be killed to set an example for all other cities. This was early psychological warfare.

To refer to the nine strategic principles outlined above, the Mongol strategy was directed toward an objective (that schwerpunkt (main focus) being the morale and mental state of the opposing population) achieved through the offensive; this offensive was itself characterized by concentration of force, maneuver, surprise, and simplicity.

Early Modern era
In 1520 Niccolò Machiavelli's Dell'arte della guerra (Art of War) dealt with the relationship between civil and military matters and the formation of grand strategy. In the Thirty Years' War (1618-1648), Gustavus Adolphus of Sweden demonstrated advanced operational strategy that led to his victories on the soil of the Holy Roman Empire. It was not until the 18th century that military strategy was subjected to serious study in Europe. The word was first used in German as "Strategie" in a translation of Leo VI's Tactica in 1777 by Johann von Bourscheid. From then onwards, the use of the word spread throughout the West.

In the Seven Years' War (1756–1763), Frederick the Great improvised a "strategy of exhaustion" (see attrition warfare) to hold off his opponents and conserve his Prussian forces. Assailed from all sides by France, Austria, Russia and Sweden, Frederick exploited his central position, which enabled him to move his army along interior lines and concentrate against one opponent at a time. Unable to achieve victory, he was able to stave off defeat until a diplomatic solution emerged. Frederick's "victory" led to great significance being placed on "geometric strategy" which emphasized lines of manoeuvre, awareness of terrain and possession of critical strong-points.

Napoleonic

The French Revolutionary Wars and the Napoleonic Wars that followed revolutionized military strategy. The impact of this period was still to be felt in the American Civil War and the early phases of World War I.

With the advent of cheap small arms and the rise of the drafted citizen soldier, armies grew rapidly in size to become massed formations. This necessitated dividing the army first into divisions and later into corps. Along with divisions came divisional artillery; light-weight, mobile cannon with great range and firepower. The rigid formations of pikemen and musketeers firing massed volleys gave way to light infantry fighting in skirmish lines.

Napoleon I of France took advantage of these developments to pursue an effective "battle of annihilation". Napoleon invariably sought to achieve decision in battle, with the sole aim of utterly destroying his opponent, usually achieving success through superior maneuver. As ruler and general he dealt with the grand strategy as well as the operational strategy, making use of political and economic measures.

While not the originator of the methods he used, Napoleon effectively combined the relatively superior maneuver and battle stages into one event. Before this, General Officers had considered this approach to battle as separate events. However, Napoleon used the maneuver to battle to dictate how and where the battle would progress. The Battle of Austerlitz was a perfect example of this maneuver. Napoleon withdrew from a strong position to draw his opponent forward and tempt him into a flank attack, weakening his center. This allowed the French army to split the allied army and gain victory.

Napoleon used two primary strategies for the approach to battle. His "Manoeuvre De Derrière" (move onto the rear) was intended to place the French Army across the enemy's lines of communications. This forced the opponent to either march to battle with Napoleon or attempt to find an escape route around the army. By placing his army into the rear, his opponent's supplies and communications would be cut. This had a negative effect on enemy morale. Once joined, the battle would be one in which his opponent could not afford defeat. This also allowed Napoleon to select multiple battle angles into a battle site. Initially, the lack of force concentration helped with foraging for food and sought to confuse the enemy as to his real location and intentions.

The "indirect" approach into battle also allowed Napoleon to disrupt the linear formations used by the allied armies. As the battle progressed, the enemy committed their reserves to stabilize the situation, Napoleon would suddenly release the flanking formation to attack the enemy. His opponents, being suddenly confronted with a new threat and with little reserves, had no choice but to weaken the area closest to the flanking formation and draw up a battle line at a right angle in an attempt to stop this new threat. Once this had occurred, Napoleon would mass his reserves at the hinge of that right angle and launch a heavy attack to break the lines. The rupture in the enemy lines allowed Napoleon's cavalry to flank both lines and roll them up leaving his opponent no choice but to surrender or flee.

The second strategy used by Napoleon I of France when confronted with two or more enemy armies was the use of the central position. This allowed Napoleon to drive a wedge to separate the enemy armies. He would then use part of his force to mask one army while the larger portion overwhelmed and defeated the second army quickly. He would then march on the second army leaving a portion to pursue the first army and repeat the operations (defeat in detail). This was designed to achieve the highest concentration of men into the primary battle while limiting the enemy's ability to reinforce the critical battle. The central position did have a weakness in that the full power of the pursuit of the enemy could not be achieved because the second army needed attention. Napoleon used the central position strategy during the Battle of Waterloo.

Waterloo

Napoleon masked Wellington and massed against the Prussian army, and then after the Battle of Ligny was won, Napoleon attempted to do the same to the Allied/British army located just to the south of Waterloo. His subordinate was unable to mask the defeated Prussian army, who reinforced the Waterloo battle in time to defeat Napoleon and end his domination of Europe.

It can be said that the Prussian Army under Blücher used the "maneuver de derrière" against Napoleon who was suddenly placed in a position of reacting to a new enemy threat.

Napoleon's practical strategic triumphs, repeatedly leading smaller forces to defeat larger ones, inspired a whole new field of study into military strategy. In particular, his opponents were keen to develop a body of knowledge in this area to allow them to counteract a masterful individual with a highly competent group of officers, a General Staff. The two most significant students of his work were Carl von Clausewitz, a Prussian with a background in philosophy, and Antoine-Henri Jomini, who had been one of Napoleon's staff officers.

One notable exception to Napoleon's strategy of annihilation and a precursor to trench warfare were the Lines of Torres Vedras during the Peninsular War. French Armies lived off the land and when they were confronted by a line of fortifications which they could not out flank, they were unable to continue the advance and were forced to retreat once they had consumed all the provisions of the region in front of the lines.

The Peninsular campaign was notable for the development of another method of warfare which went largely unnoticed at the time, but would become far more common in the 20th century. That was the aid and encouragement the British gave to the Spanish to harass the French behind their lines which led them to squander most of the assets of their Iberian army in protecting the army's line of communications. This was a very cost effective move for the British, because it cost far less to aid Spanish insurgents than it did to equip and pay regular British army units to engage the same number of French troops.

As the British army could be correspondingly smaller it was able to supply its troops by sea and land without having to live off the land as was the norm at the time. Further, because they did not have to forage they did not antagonise the locals and so did not have to garrison their lines of communications to the same extent as the French did. So the strategy of aiding their Spanish civilian allies in their guerrilla or 'small war' benefited the British in many ways, not all of which were immediately obvious.

Clausewitz and Jomini
Clausewitz's On War has become the respected reference for strategy, dealing with political, as well as military, leadership. His most famous assertion being:

"War is not merely a political act, but also a real political instrument, a continuation of policy by other means."

For Clausewitz, war was first and foremost a political act, and thus the purpose of all strategy was to achieve the political goal that the state was seeking to accomplish. As such, Clausewitz famously argued that war was the "continuation of politics by other means", and as such, argued that the amount of force used by the state would and should be proportional to whatever the political aim that the state was seeking to achieve via war. Clausewitz further dismissed "geometry" as an insignificant factor in strategy, believing instead that ideally all wars should follow the Napoleonic concept of victory through a decisive battle of annihilation and destruction of the opposing force, at any cost. However, he also recognized that his ideal of how war should be fought was not always practical in reality and that limited warfare could influence policy by wearing down the opposition through a "strategy of attrition".

In contrast to Clausewitz, Antoine-Henri Jomini dealt mainly with operational strategy, planning and intelligence, the conduct of the campaign, and "generalship" rather than "statesmanship". He proposed that victory could be achieved by occupying the enemy's territory rather than destroying his army.

As such, geometric considerations  were prominent in his theory of strategy. Jomini's two basic principles of strategy were to concentrate against fractions of the enemy force at a time and to strike at the most decisive objective.  Clausewitz and Jomini are required reading for today's military professional officer.

Industrial age

The evolution of military strategy continued in the American Civil War (1861–1865). The practice of strategy was advanced by generals such as Robert E. Lee, Ulysses S. Grant and William Tecumseh Sherman, all of whom had been influenced by the feats of Napoleon (Thomas "Stonewall" Jackson was said to have carried a book of Napoleon's maxims with him.)

However, the adherence to the Napoleonic principles in the face of technological advances such as the long-range infantry breechloader rifles and minie ball guns generally led to disastrous consequences for both the Union and Confederate  forces and populace. The time and space in which war was waged changed as well.  Railroads enabled swift movement of large forces but the manoeuvring was constrained to narrow, vulnerable corridors. Steam power and ironclads changed transport and combat at sea. Newly invented telegraph enabled more rapid communication between armies and their headquarters capitals. Combat was still usually waged by opposing divisions with skirmish lines on rural battlefields, violent naval engagements by cannon-armed sailing or steam-powered vessels, and assault on military forces defending a town.

There was still room for triumphs for the strategy of manoeuvre such as Sherman's March to the Sea in 1864, but these depended upon an enemy's unwillingness to entrench. Towards the end of the war, especially in defense of static targets as in the battles of Cold Harbor and Vicksburg, trench networks foreshadowed World War I. Many of the lessons of the American Civil War were forgotten, when in wars like the Austro-Prussian War or the Franco-Prussian War, manoeuvre won the day.

In the period preceding World War I, two of the most influential strategists were the Prussian generals, Helmuth von Moltke and Alfred von Schlieffen. Under Moltke the Prussian army achieved victory in the Austro-Prussian War (1866) and the Franco-Prussian War (1870–71), the latter campaign being widely regarded as a classic example of the conception and execution of military strategy.

In addition to exploiting railroads and highways for manoeuvre, Moltke also exploited the telegraph for control of large armies. He recognised the need to delegate control to subordinate commanders and to issue directives rather than specific orders. Moltke is most remembered as a strategist for his belief in the need for flexibility and that no plan, however well prepared, can be guaranteed to survive beyond the first encounter with the enemy.

Field Marshal Schlieffen succeeded Moltke and directed German planning in the lead up to World War I. He advocated the "strategy of annihilation" but was faced by a war on two fronts against numerically superior opposition. The strategy he formulated was the Schlieffen Plan, defending in the east while concentrating for a decisive victory in the west, after which the Germans would go on to the offensive in the east. Influenced by Hannibal's success at the Battle of Cannae, Schlieffen planned for a single great battle of encirclement, thereby annihilating his enemy.

Another German strategist of the period was Hans Delbrück who expanded on Clausewitz's concept of "limited warfare" to produce a theory on the "strategy of exhaustion". His theory defied popular military thinking of the time, which was strongly in favour of victory in battle, yet World War I would soon demonstrate the flaws of a mindless "strategy of annihilation".

At a time when industrialisation was rapidly changing naval technology, one American strategist, Alfred Thayer Mahan, almost single-handedly brought the field of naval strategy up to date. Influenced by Jomini's principles of strategy, he saw that in the coming wars, where economic strategy could be as important as military strategy, control of the sea granted the power to control the trade and resources needed to wage war. Mahan pushed the concept of the "big navy" and an expansionist view where defence was achieved by controlling the sea approaches rather than fortifying the coast. His theories contributed to the naval arms race between 1898 and 1914.

World War I

At the start of World War I strategy was dominated by the offensive thinking that had been in vogue since 1870, despite the more recent experiences of the Second Boer War (1899–1902) and Russo-Japanese War (1904–05), where the machine gun demonstrated its defensive capabilities. By the end of 1914, the Western Front was a stalemate and all ability to maneuver strategically was lost. The combatants resorted to a "strategy of attrition". The German battle at Verdun, the British on the Somme and at Passchendaele were among the first wide-scale battles intended to wear down the enemy. Attrition was time-consuming so the duration of World War I battles often stretched to weeks and months. The problem with attrition was that the use of fortified defenses in depth generally required a ratio of ten attackers to one defender, or a level of artillery support which was simply not feasible until late 1917, for any reasonable chance of victory. The ability of the defender to move troops using interior lines prevented the possibility of fully exploiting any breakthrough with the level of technology then attainable.

Perhaps the most controversial aspect of strategy in World War I was the difference among the British between the "Western" viewpoint (held by Field Marshal Haig) and the "Eastern"; the former being that all effort should be directed against the German Army, the latter that more useful work could be done by attacking Germany's allies. The term "Knocking away the props" was used, perhaps as an unfortunate consequence of the fact that all of Germany's allies lay south of (i.e., 'beneath') her on the map. Proponents of the Western viewpoint make the valid point that Germany's allies were more than once rescued from disaster or rendered capable of holding their own or making substantial gains by the provision of German troops, arms or military advisers, whereas those allies did not at any time provide a similar function for Germany. That is, it was Germany which was the prop, and her allies (particularly Bulgaria and Austria-Hungary) did not suffer significant reverses until Germany's ability to come to their aid was grossly impaired.

On other fronts, there was still room for the use of strategy of maneuver. The Germans executed a perfect battle of annihilation against the Russians at the Battle of Tannenberg. In 1915 Britain and France launched the well-intentioned but poorly conceived and ultimately fruitless Dardanelles Campaign, combining naval power and an amphibious landing, in an effort to aid their Russian ally and knock the Ottoman Empire out of the war. The Palestine campaign was dominated by cavalry, which flourished in the local terrain, and the British achieved two breakthrough victories at Gaza (1917) and Megiddo (1918). Colonel T. E. Lawrence and other British officers led Arab irregulars on a guerrilla campaign against the Ottomans, using strategy and tactics developed during the Boer Wars.

World War I saw armies on a scale never before experienced. The British, who had always relied on a strong navy and a small regular army, were forced to undertake a rapid expansion of the army. This outpaced the rate of training of generals and staff officers able to handle such a mammoth force, and overwhelmed the ability of British industry to equip it with the necessary weapons and adequate high-quality munitions until late in the war. Technological advances also had a huge influence on strategy: aerial reconnaissance, artillery techniques, poison gas, the automobile and tank (though the latter was, even at the end of the war, still in its infancy), telephone and radio telegraphy.

More so than in previous wars, military strategy in World War I was directed by the grand strategy of a coalition of nations; the Entente on one side and the Central Powers on the other. Society and economy were mobilized for total war. Attacks on the enemy's economy included Britain's use of a naval blockade and Germany employing submarine warfare against merchant shipping.

Unity of command became a question when the various nation states began coordinating assaults and defenses. Under the pressure of horrendously destructive German attacks beginning on March 21, 1918, the Entente eventually settled under Field Marshal Ferdinand Foch. The Germans generally led the Central Powers, though German authority diminished and lines of command became confused at the end of the war.

World War I strategy was dominated by the "Spirit of the Offensive", where generals resorted almost to mysticism in terms of a soldier's personal "attitude" in order to break the stalemate; this led to nothing but bloody slaughter as troops in close ranks charged machine guns. Each side developed an alternate thesis. The British under Winston Churchill developed tank warfare, with which they eventually won the war. The Germans developed a "doctrine of autonomy", the forerunner of both blitzkrieg and modern infantry tactics, using groups of stormtroopers, who would advance in small mutually covering groups from cover to cover with "autonomy" to exploit any weakness they discovered in enemy defenses. Almost all the blitzkrieg commanders of World War II, particularly Erwin Rommel, were stormtroopers in World War I. After the Treaty of Brest-Litovsk, Germany launched and almost succeeded in a final offensive. However, the new tactics of autonomy revealed a weakness in terms of overall coordination and direction. The March offensive, intended to drive a wedge between the French and British armies, turn on the latter and destroy it, lost direction and became driven by its territorial gains, its original purpose neglected.

World War I ended when the ability of the German army to fight became so diminished that Germany asked for peace conditions. The German military, exhausted by the efforts of the March offensives and dispirited by their failure, was first seriously defeated during the Battle of Amiens (8–11 August 1918) and the German homefront entered general revolt over a lack of food and destruction of the economy. Victory for the Entente was almost assured by that point, and the fact of Germany's military impotence was driven home in the following hundred days. In this time, the Entente reversed the gains the Germans had made in the first part of the year, and the British Army (spearheaded by the Canadians and Australians) finally broke the Hindenburg defensive system.

Though his methods are questioned, Britain's Field Marshal Haig was ultimately proved correct in his grand strategic vision: "We cannot hope to win until we have defeated the German Army." By the end of the war, the best German troops were dead and the remainder were under continuous pressure on all parts of the Western Front, a consequence in part of an almost endless supply of fresh American reinforcements (which the Germans were unable to match) and in part of industry at last supplying the weakened Entente armies with the firepower to replace the men they lacked (whilst Germany wanted for all sorts of materials thanks to the naval blockade). Interior lines thus became meaningless as Germany had nothing more to offer its allies. The props eventually fell, but only because they were themselves no longer supported.

The role of the tank in World War I strategy is often poorly understood. Its supporters saw it as the weapon of victory, and many observers since have accused the high commands (especially the British) of shortsightedness in this matter, particularly in view of what tanks have achieved since. Nevertheless, the World War I tank's limitations, imposed by the limits of contemporary engineering technology, have to be borne in mind. They were slow (men could run, and frequently walk, faster); vulnerable (to artillery) due to their size, clumsiness and inability to carry armour against anything but rifle and machine gun ammunition; extremely uncomfortable (conditions inside them often incapacitating crews with engine fumes and heat, and driving some mad with noise); and often despicably unreliable (frequently failing to make it to their targets due to engine or track failures). This was the factor behind the seemingly mindless retention of large bodies of cavalry, which even in 1918, with armies incompletely mechanised, were still the only armed force capable of moving significantly faster than an infantryman on foot. It was not until the relevant technology (in engineering and communications) matured between the wars that the tank and the airplane could be forged into the co-ordinated force needed to truly restore manoeuvre to warfare.

Inter war
In the years following World War I, two of the technologies that had been introduced during that conflict, the aircraft and the tank, became the subject of strategic study.

The leading theorist of air power was Italian general Giulio Douhet, who believed that future wars would be won or lost in the air. The air force would carry the offensive, and the role of the ground forces would be defensive only. Douhet's doctrine of strategic bombing meant striking at the enemy's heartland—his cities, industry and communications. Air power would thereby reduce his willingness and capacity to fight. At this time the idea of the aircraft carrier and its capabilities also started to change thinking in those countries with large fleets, but nowhere as much as in Japan. The UK and US seem to have seen the carrier as a defensive weapon, and their designs mirrored this; the Japanese Imperial Navy seem to have developed a new offensive strategy based on the power projection these made possible.

British general J. F. C. Fuller, architect of the first great tank battle at Cambrai, and his contemporary, B. H. Liddell Hart, were amongst the most prominent advocates of mechanization and motorization of the army in Britain. In Germany, study groups were set up by Hans von Seeckt, commander of the Reichswehr Truppenamt, for 57 areas of strategy and tactics to learn from World War I and to adapt strategy to avoid the stalemate and then defeat they had suffered. All seem to have seen the strategic shock value of mobility and the new possibilities made possible by motorised forces. Both saw that the armoured fighting vehicle demonstrated firepower, mobility and protection. The Germans seem to have seen more clearly the need to make all branches of the Army as mobile as possible to maximise the results of this strategy. It would negate the static defences of the trench and machine gun and restore the strategic principles of manoeuvre and offense. Nevertheless, it was the British Army which was the only  one truly mechanised at the beginning of the Second World War, the Germans still relying on horse traction for a large portion of their artillery.

The innovative German Major (later General) Heinz Guderian developed the motorised part of this strategy as the head of one of the Truppenamt groups and may have incorporated Fuller's and Liddell Hart's ideas to amplify the groundbreaking Blitzkrieg effect that was seen used by Germany against Poland in 1939 and later against France in 1940. France, still committed to stationary World War I strategies, was completely surprised and summarily overwhelmed by Germany's mobile combined arms doctrine and Guderian's Panzer Corps.

Technological change had an enormous effect on strategy, but little effect on leadership. The use of telegraph and later radio, along with improved transport, enabled the rapid movement of large numbers of men. One of Germany's key enablers in mobile warfare was the use of radios, where these were put into every tank. However, the number of men that one officer could effectively control had, if anything, declined. The increases in the size of the armies led to an increase in the number of officers. Although the officer ranks in the US Army did swell, in the German army the ratio of officers to total men remained steady.

World War II

German

Pre-war
Inter-war Germany had as its main strategic goals the re-establishment of Germany as a European great power and the complete annulment of the Versailles treaty of 1919. After Adolf Hitler and the Nazi party  took power in 1933, Germany's political goals also included the accumulation of Lebensraum ("Living space") for the Germanic "race" and the elimination of Communism as a political rival to  Nazism.  The destruction of European Jewry, while not strictly a strategic objective, was a political goal of the Nazi regime linked to the vision of a German-dominated Europe, and especially to the Generalplan Ost for a depopulated east which Germany could colonize.

Until the mid-1930s, Germany's ability to realize these goals was limited by her weakened military and economic position. Hitler's strategy involved building up German military and economic strength through re-armament, while seeking to avoid an early war by diplomatic engagement with France, Britain and (later) the Soviet Union (Stalin-Hitler Pact of August 1939). One by one, Hitler successfully repudiated the terms the Versailles treaty, using skilful diplomacy to avoid triggering war. After starting open re-armament in 1935, he carried out the re-occupation of the Rhineland in 1936, and then the diplomatic annexation of Austria (Anschluss) and of Czechoslovakia in 1938 and 1939 (Munich Agreement, September 1938). This risky political strategy proved initially successful, consolidating internal support for the Nazi regime and greatly strengthening Germany's strategic position.

But the March 1939 annexation of rump Czechoslovakia, in violation of the Munich Agreement signed only months before, forced a change in Franco-British policy from an emphasis on avoiding war (Appeasement) to an emphasis on war preparation, of which an important feature was the declaration of  Franco-British guarantees of Polish independence. When Germany invaded Poland in September 1939, Britain and France declared war (3 September 1939).

War strategy

Hitler's strategy for war was laid out in Mein Kampf (1925/1926). Whether Hitler intended global or merely European conquest, or whether he even had a plan for war in advance is debated; see Nazi foreign policy (historiographic debate). In Mein Kampf, Hitler had imagined a short war against France, and then the conquest of the USSR. He had wrongly assumed that Britain would be a German ally in the west against France, and so he did not foresee an enduring war in the west.

Once the Second World War had begun with France and Britain as allies, German strategy aimed to win a short war in France and to force Britain to the negotiating table. After the  conquest of France in May–June 1940, Churchill's refusal to surrender or to negotiate on terms favorable for Germany put the German gamble in jeopardy. Germany could not match Britain on the open sea and had not prepared its army for operations across the Channel. Instead, the Wehrmacht hoped to strangle Britain's economy through success in the Battle of the Atlantic (1939–1945) and the Battle of Britain (1940).

In June 1941 Germany invaded the USSR (Operation Barbarossa) to carry out the second part of Hitler's strategy. The campaign plan envisaged  defeating the USSR in a single summer / fall campaign, but Barbarossa failed to achieve any of its major objectives. In December 1941 Japan attacked the USA and Germany declared war on the USA shortly afterwards. Through the summer and fall of 1942, German strategy to win the war remained based on defeating the USSR.

British
Since the Entente Cordiale which had won the First World War, Britain's strategy for continental war was based on alliance with France and later unsuccessful efforts to engage Fascist Italy and the USSR in an effort to contain Germany. Confronted with the rise of Hitler's power on the continent in 1933, and weakened economically by the Great Depression, Great Britain sought initially to avoid or delay war through diplomacy (Appeasement), while at the same time re-arming (Neville Chamberlain's European Policy). Emphasis for re-armament was given to air forces with the view that these would be most useful in any future war with Germany.

By 1939, Allied efforts to avert war had failed, and Germany had signed alliances with both Italy (Pact of Steel) and the USSR (Molotov–Ribbentrop Pact). In August 1939, in a final effort to contain Germany, Britain and France guaranteed Polish independence (Anglo-Polish military alliance).

Upon the outbreak of war in September 1939, British rearmament was not yet complete, although the Royal Air Force had been greatly expanded and programmes for new aircraft and equipment such as radar defences were just coming to fruition. Britain remained incapable of offensive operations except for strategic bombing, and this was relatively ineffective in the early war.

After the fall of France in mid 1940 and Italian entry into the war on the Axis side, Britain and her commonwealth allies found themselves alone against most of Europe. British strategy was one of survival, defending the British isles directly in the Battle of Britain and indirectly by defeating Germany in the Battle of the Atlantic and the combined Axis powers in the North African Campaign. Through this period, and until the German invasion of the USSR in June 1941, there was no possibility of Britain winning the war alone, and so British Grand Strategy aimed to bring the USA into the war on the allied side. Prime Minister Churchill devoted much of his diplomatic efforts to this goal. In August 1941, at the Atlantic Conference he met US President Roosevelt in the first of many wartime meetings wherein allied war strategy was jointly decided.

In December 1941, following the Japanese attack on Pearl Harbor, the United States entered the war. Britain was now also at war with imperial Japan, whose forces inflicted rapid defeats on British forces in Asia, capturing Hong Kong, Malaya, Singapore and Burma. Nevertheless, Churchill expressed the view that with the entry of the USA into the war, ultimate victory was assured for the Allies. "All the rest was merely the proper application of overwhelming force". From this point onward, the strategy of the Allies, other than the USSR, is better addressed as joint Allied Strategy

European Allies
In the December 1941, at the Arcadia Conference, the Allied leaders agreed to the "Germany first" principle whereby Germany was to be defeated first, and then Japan. However, Allied land forces would not be capable of invading the mainland of Europe for years, even as Joseph Stalin pressed for the western allies to alleviate pressure on the Eastern front. Supporting the Soviet war effort was a significant element of Allied strategy, and significant aid was shipped to the USSR through the Lend-Lease programme.

Strategic warfare, and especially strategic bombing, was a supporting component of Allied strategy. Through 1942 and 1943, the Allies gradually won the war at sea and in the air, blockading Germany and subjecting her to a strategic bombing campaign of increasing effectiveness Strategic bombing during World War II.

In January 1943, at the Casablanca Conference, the Allies agreed to demand Axis unconditional surrender, a war aim which implied the physical occupation of Germany with land forces. While building up strength for an invasion of continental Europe, the Allies pursued an indirect strategy by invading Europe from the South. After defeating Axis forces in North Africa (the invasion of French North-Africa), Sicily and southern Italy were invaded, leading to the defeat of Fascist Italy. Churchill especially favoured a Southern strategy, aiming to attack the "soft underbelly" of Axis Europe through Italy, Greece and the Balkans in a strategy similar to the First World War idea of "knocking out the supports". Roosevelt favoured a more direct approach through northern Europe, and with the Invasion of Normandy in June 1944, the weight of Allied effort shifted to the direct conquest of Germany.

From 1944, as German defeat became more and more inevitable, the shape of post-war Europe assumed greater importance in Allied strategy. At the Second Quebec Conference in September 1944, the Allies agreed to partition and de-industrialize a defeated Germany so as to render her permanently unable to wage war Morgenthau Plan. After the war, this plan was abandoned as unworkable. At the Tehran Conference Allied strategy adopted its final major component with the acceptance of Soviet conditions for a sphere of influence in Eastern Europe, to include eastern Germany and Berlin.

Soviet
Early Soviet strategy aimed to avoid or delay war, while developing the central government's hold over the state and expanding the industrial base. Soviet economy and military was weak, but rapidly expanding in an intense industrialization process. The USSR had been overtly hostile to Nazi Germany for most of the pre-war period, but the failure of appeasement convinced Stalin that the Allies were actively seeking a Nazi–Soviet war. The Soviet government doubted that a war against Germany could be avoided. However, negotiations were continued in order to, at the very least, buy time and permit the Soviets to secure the Soviet–German border through expansion and pressure on strategically important states perceived as possible German allies in a future war. The signing of the Molotov–Ribbentrop pact gave the USSR freedom to, in its view, preempt hostile action from nations along its Western border.

The invasion in the Barbarossa campaign of 1941 came earlier than expected to the Soviet leadership, resulting in the catastrophic loss of over 4 million Soviet soldiers killed or captured. Nevertheless, the USSR managed to halt the German advance at the outskirts of Moscow and Leningrad. With spies providing the certain knowledge that Japanese forces in the far east would not attack Siberia, the Soviets were able to transfer large numbers of experienced forces from the far east, and in the Winter of 1941/1942 they used them to counter-attack the German Army Group Centre in front of Moscow.

As the army was being defeated and giving up ground in the initial assault, a gigantic operation was staged to move economic capacity from the Western areas that were about to be overrun, to Eastern regions in the Urals and central Asia that were out of reach of the Germans. Entire factories, including their labour force, were simply moved, and what couldn't be taken was destroyed ("scorched earth"). As a result, even though huge territories were captured by the Germans, the production potential of the Soviet economy was not correspondingly harmed, and the factories shifted to mass production of military equipment quickly. Even before the war, Soviet industrialization had brought Soviet GDP to a level roughly equivalent to Germany. Although a significant part of the urban population had been captured by Germany in the 1941 campaign, the Soviet economy immediately went to a total war footing and was soon outproducing the German economy in war materiel.

It quickly became apparent that the war in the east would be pitiless and total. Soviet strategy was therefore aimed at preserving the state, at whatever cost, and then the ultimate defeat and conquest of Germany. This strategy was successful. By 1943, the USSR was confident in final victory and new aim of Soviet strategy became securing a favourable post-war Europe. At the Tehran Conference of 1943, Stalin secured acquiescence to a Soviet sphere in influence from his western allies.

Japanese
Japanese World War II strategy was driven by two factors: the desire to expand their territories on the mainland of Asia (China and Manchuria), and the need to secure the supply of raw resources they didn't have themselves, particularly oil. Since their quest after the former (conquest of Chinese provinces) endangered the latter (an oil boycott by the US and its allies), the Japanese government saw no other option than to conquer the oil sources in South-East Asia. Since these were controlled by American allies, war with the USA was seen as inevitable; thus, Japanese leaders decided it would be best to deal a severe blow to the U.S. first. This was executed in the Pearl Harbor strike, crippling the American battle fleet.

Japan hoped it would take America so long to rebuild, by the time she was able to return in force in the Pacific, she would consider the new balance of power a "fait accompli", and negotiate a peace. However, the attack on Pearl Harbor failed to destroy the crucial targets (aircraft carriers and, most crucially for Japan's ability to hold island bases, submarines) and ignored others (oil tank farms, power station), thus the U.S. Navy was not weakened enough to force withdrawal. The psychological effect also caused the U.S. population and armed forces to fully mobilize for war. South-East Asia was quickly conquered (Philippines, Indochina, Malaysia and the Dutch East Indies). After Japan's vital aircraft carrier force was destroyed in the Battle of Midway, the Japanese had to revert to a stiff defense they kept up for the remainder of the war.

American
With both Japan and the US fighting two-front wars (against each other in the Pacific, and additionally the US in Europe and the Japanese in China), the far greater American economic power enabled the US forces to replace battle losses considerably faster and to eventually outgun the Japanese. In several aircraft carrier battles, the initiative was taken from the Japanese, and after the Battle of Midway, the Japanese navy was rendered helpless, effectively giving the Americans vast naval superiority.

After the Japanese were forced into the defensive in the second half of 1942, the Americans were confronted with heavily fortified garrisons on small islands. They decided on a strategy of "island hopping", leaving the strongest garrisons alone, just cutting off their supply via naval blockades and bombardment, and securing bases of operation on the lightly defended islands instead. The most notable of these island battles was the Battle of Iwo Jima, where the American victory paved the way for the aerial bombing of the Japanese mainland, which culminated in the atomic bombings of Hiroshima and Nagasaki and the Bombing of Tokyo that forced Japan to surrender.

Australian
Australia's historical ties with Britain meant that with the commencement of World War II her armies were sent overseas to contribute to battles in Europe. Fear from the north was so understated that at the outbreak of open warfare with Japan, Australia itself was extremely vulnerable to invasion (possible invasion plans were considered by the Japanese high command, though there was strong opposition). Australia's policy became based entirely on domestic defense following the attacks on Pearl Harbor and British assets in the South Pacific. Defying strong British opposition, Australian Prime Minister John Curtin recalled most troops from the European conflict for the defense of the nation.

Australia's defensive doctrine saw a fierce campaign fought along the Kokoda track in New Guinea. This campaign sought to further stretch Japanese supply lines, preventing the invasion of the Australian mainland until the arrival of fresh American troops and the return of seasoned Australian soldiers from Europe. This can be seen as a variant of the war of attrition strategy, where the defender—out of necessity—had to hold the aggressor at a semi-static defensive line, rather than falling back in the face of superior numbers. This method is in stark contrast to the Russian scorched earth policy against Napoleon in 1812, where the defenders yielded home territory in favour of avoiding open battle. In both cases the lack of supplies was successful in blunting the assaults, following exhaustive defensive efforts.

Communist China's strategy
The Chinese Communist leader Mao Zedong developed a military strategy called people's war. It aimed at creating and maintaining support of the local population, and draw the enemy deep into the interior where the force adopting the strategy would exhaust them through a mix of guerrilla and conventional warfare.

The strategy was first used by the Communists against the forces of the Nationalist Government led by Chiang Kai-shek in the Chinese Civil War in the 1930s. During and after the arduous Long March, the Communist forces, who were dramatically reduced by physical exhaustion, disease and warfare, were in danger of destruction by the pursuing Nationalist forces. Mao then convinced other high-ranking political officers in the party to acquire the support of the local population whilst fighting their way northwards from the Nationalist forces. Shortly thereafter he formulated the concept of people's war, promising land reform programs to the local populace and execution of the local landlords in the areas the Communists control. Using this strategy not only prevented the Communist leadership from collapsing, but also raised popular support across China, which eventually allowed them to take total control over the Chinese mainland.

The people's war is not only a military strategy but also a political one. In its original formulation by Mao Zedong, people's war exploits the few advantages that a small revolutionary movement has against a government's power including a large and well-equipped army. People's war strategically avoids decisive battles, since their tiny military force would easily be routed in an all-out confrontation with the government's army. Instead, it favours a three-stage strategy of protracted warfare, engaging only in carefully chosen battles that can realistically be won. Relying on the local population and using small military units, ensures that there are few problems concerning logistics and supplies.

In stage one, the revolutionary force sets up in a remote area with mountainous or forested terrain where its enemy is weak, and attempts to establish a local stronghold known as a revolutionary base area. As it grows in power, it enters stage two, establishes other revolutionary base areas, where it may exercise governing power and gain popular support through political programmes, such as land reform. Eventually in stage three, the movement has enough strength to encircle and capture cities of increasing size, until finally it seizes power in the entire country.

Within the Chinese Red Army, later to be called as the People's Liberation Army, the concept of People's War was the basis of strategy against the Japanese and Nationalist forces, and also against a hypothetical Russian invasion of China. The concept of people's war became less important with the collapse of the Soviet Union and the increasing possibility of conflict with the United States over Taiwan.

The strategy was utilized in the early 1950s by the hastily formed People's Volunteer Army during the Korean War, to garner support from the local Korean populace to win the war by driving the United Nations forces from the peninsula. At the battles of Chongchon river valley and Lake Changjin, the army employed guerrilla tactics in full scale, following the people's war doctrine. However, as they marched towards the South under Mao's stern orders after their decisive victories in northern Korea, they were met by an indifferent and sometimes hostile Southern population who, despite intimidation, were not willing to help them. This prevented them from defeating the UN forces in Korea and, after their hard-fought victory at the Third Battle of Seoul, they were beaten in the open by UN forces in the conclusion of their Third Phase Campaign. Later on the war turned into a stalemated two-year confrontation between the opposing forces. Thus, years after the war, the Chinese government began a series of army modernization and professionalization that would radically change the concept of the strategy, and in the 1980s and 1990s the concept of people's war was changed to include more high-technology weaponry.

The people's war strategy was also employed in countries around the world such as Cuba, Nicaragua, Nepal, Philippines, the United Kingdom (where the IRA was in rebellion in Northern Ireland and applied this strategy to urban warfare) and elsewhere. The people's war in the first three countries mentioned have been spectacularly successful, marking government transitions in these countries, while elsewhere such as in Peru it has been unsuccessful. The people's war in the Philippines that was long since employed by the insurgent New People's Army, however, made the Communist insurgency there the longest in world history,. In India and Turkey there are still ongoing insurgencies where the rebels use this strategy.

Cold War
The strategy of the Cold War was that of containment, and it was a generation dominated by the threat of total world annihilation through the use of nuclear weapons. Deterrence was a part of containment via retributive intimidation from the risk of mutually assured destruction. As a consequence, it was also a war in which attacks were not exchanged between the two main rivals, the United States and the Soviet Union. Instead, the war was fought through proxies. Instead of mainly being confined to Europe or the Pacific, the entire world was the battlefield, with countries rather than armies acting as main players. The only constant rule was that troops of the Soviet Union and the United States could not overtly fight with each other. Military strategy involved bipolar powers with global actors who could strike an opponent with nationally debilitating destruction in a matter of minutes from land, air, and sea.

With the advent of weapons of mass destruction that could decide a war by themselves, strategies shifted away from a focus on the application of conventional weaponry to a greater focus on espionage and intelligence assessment, especially after the exposure of the Atomic spies.

The difference between tactics, strategy and grand strategy began to melt during the Cold War as command and communication technologies improved to a greater extent, in first world armed forces. The third world armed forces controlled by the two superpowers found that grand strategy, strategy and tactics, if anything, moved further apart as the command of the armies fell under the control of super power leaders.

American cold warriors like Dean Acheson and George C. Marshall quickly recognized that the key to victory was the economic defeat of the Soviet Union. The Soviet Union had adopted an aggressive posture of Communist expansionism following the end of World War II, with the United States and its strong navy quickly finding that it had to aggressively defend much of the world from the Soviet Union and the spread of communism.

Strategies during the Cold War also dealt with nuclear attack and retaliation. The United States and NATO maintained a policy of limited first strike throughout the Cold War. In the event of a Soviet attack on the Western Front, resulting in a breakthrough, the United States would use tactical nuclear weapons to stop the attack. The Soviet Union would respond with an all-out nuclear attack, resulting in a similar attack from the United States, with all the consequences the exchange would entail.

By contrast, Soviet strategy in the Cold War was dominated by the desire to prevent, at all costs, the recurrence of an invasion of Russian soil. The Soviet Union nominally adopted a policy of no first use, which in fact was a posture of launch on warning. Other than that, the USSR adapted to some degree to the prevailing changes in the NATO strategic policies that are divided by periods as:
 Strategy of massive retaliation (1950s)
 Strategy of flexible reaction (1960s)
 Strategies of realistic threat and containment (1970s)
 Strategy of direct confrontation (1980s) one of the elements of which became the new highly effective high-precision targeting weapons.
 Strategic Defense Initiative (also known as "Star Wars") during its 1980s development which became a core part of the strategic doctrine based on Defense containment.

Fortunately for all sides, the all-out nuclear World War III between NATO and the Warsaw Pact did not take place. The United States recently (April 2010) acknowledged a new approach to its nuclear policy which describes the weapons' purpose as "primarily" or "fundamentally" to deter or respond to a nuclear attack.

Post–Cold War

Strategy in the post Cold War is shaped by the global geopolitical situation: a number of potent powers in a multipolar array which has arguably come to be dominated by the hyperpower status of the United States, which increasingly relies on advanced technology to minimize casualties and to improve efficiency. The technological leaps brought by the Digital Revolution are essential for the U.S. strategy.

The gap in strategy today (from a Western viewpoint) lies in what Americans call "asymmetric warfare": the battle against guerrilla forces by conventional national armed forces. The classical strategic triumvirate of politics/military/populace is very weak against protracted warfare of paramilitary forces such as the Provisional Irish Republican Army, Hezbollah, ETA, the Kurdistan Workers' Party (PKK), and Al-Qaeda. The ability of conventional forces to deliver utility (effect) from their hugely powerful forces is largely nullified by the difficulties of distinguishing and separating combatants from the civilian populace in whose company they hide. The use of the military by the politicians to police areas seen as bases for these guerrillas leads to them becoming targets themselves which eventually undermines the support of the populace from whom they come and whose values they represent.

Parties to conflict which see themselves as vastly or temporarily inferior may adopt a strategy of "hunkering down" – witness Iraq in 1991 or Yugoslavia in 1999.

The primary effect of insurgent elements upon conventional force strategy is realized in the twofold exploitation of the inherent violence of military operations. Conventional armies face political attrition for each action they take. Insurgent forces can cause harm and create chaos (whereby the conventional army suffers a loss of confidence and esteem); or they can drive the conventional elements into an attack which further exacerbates the civilian condition.

The major militaries of today are largely set up to fight the "last war" (previous war) and hence have huge armoured and conventionally configured infantry formations backed up by air-forces and navies designed to support or prepare for these forces. Many are today deployed against guerrilla-style opponents where their strengths cannot be used to effect. The mass formations of industrial warfare are often seen as much less effective than the unconventional forces that modern militaries may also possess. The new opponents operate at a local level, whereas industrial armed forces work at a much higher "theatre" level. The nervous system of these new opponents is largely political rather than military-hierarchical and adapted to the local supporting populace who hide them. The centre provides the political idea and driving logic, perhaps with overall direction and some funding. Local groups decide their own plans, raise much of their own funding and may be more or less aligned to the centre's aims. Defeat of guerilla forces (when revealed) does not disable this type of organisation, many modern attack strategies will tend to increase the power of the group they intend to weaken. A new more political strategy is perhaps more appropriate here – with military backing. Such a strategy has been illustrated in the war against the IRA, though an adoption and codification are unclear.

Netwar
A main point in asymmetric warfare is the nature of paramilitary organizations such as Al-Qaeda which are involved in guerrilla military actions but which are not traditional organizations with a central authority defining their military and political strategies. Organizations such as Al-Qaeda may exist as a sparse network of groups lacking central coordination, making them more difficult to confront following standard strategic approaches. This new field of strategic thinking is tackled by what is now defined as netwar.

See also

General
 Strategy
 Grand strategy
 Naval strategy
 Operational mobility
 Military doctrine
 Principles of war
 Military tactics
 List of military tactics
 List of military strategies and concepts
 List of military writers
 List of military strategy books
 Roerich Pact

Examples of military strategies
 Schlieffen Plan
 Mutual assured destruction
 Blitzkrieg
 Shock and awe
 Fabian strategy
 Progressive war

Related topics
 Asymmetric warfare
 Basic Strategic Art Program
 Battleplan (documentary TV series)
 Force multiplication
 Strategic bombing
 Strategic depth
 U.S. Army Strategist
 War termination

References

Notes

Bibliography
 Carpenter, Stanley D. M., Military Leadership in the British Civil Wars, 1642–1651: The Genius of This Age, Routledge, 2005.
 Chaliand, Gérard, The Art of War in World History: From Antiquity to the Nuclear Age, University of California Press, 1994.
 Gartner, Scott Sigmund, Strategic Assessment in War, Yale University Press, 1999.
 Heuser, Beatrice, The Evolution of Strategy: Thinking War from Antiquity to the Present (Cambridge University Press, 2010), .
 Matloff, Maurice, (ed.), American Military History: 1775–1902, volume 1, Combined Books, 1996.
 May, Timothy. The Mongol Art of War: Chinggis Khan and the Mongol Military System. Barnsley, UK: Pen & Sword, 2007. .
 Wilden, Anthony, Man and Woman, War and Peace: The Strategist's Companion, Routledge, 1987.

Further reading
 The US Army War College Strategic Studies Institute publishes several dozen papers and books yearly focusing on current and future military strategy and policy, national security, and global and regional strategic issues. Most publications are relevant to the International strategic community, both academically and militarily. All are freely available to the public in PDF format. The organization was founded by General Dwight D. Eisenhower after World War II.
 Black, Jeremy, Introduction to Global Military History: 1775 to the Present Day, Routledge Press, 2005.
 D'Aguilar, G.C., Napoleon's Military Maxims, free ebook, Napoleon's Military Maxims.
 Freedman, Lawrence. Strategy: A History (2013) excerpt
 Holt, Thaddeus, The Deceivers: Allied Military Deception in the Second World War, Simon and Schuster, June, 2004, hardcover, 1184 pages, .
 Tomes, Robert R., US Defense Strategy from Vietnam to Operation Iraqi Freedom: Military Innovation and the New American Way of War, 1973–2003, Routledge Press, 2007.

 
Security studies